Timewasters is a British science-fiction comedy television programme, first broadcast on ITV2 in 2017 with a second series broadcast in 2019. It was created by Daniel Lawrence Taylor and written by Taylor and Barunka O'Shaughnessy. It was produced for ITV Studios by Kenton Allen and Matthew Justice of Big Talk Productions. Episodes were directed by George Kane. The programme stars Taylor, Adelayo Adedayo, Samson Kayo and Kadiff Kirwan as the members of an unsuccessful all-black South London jazz quartet who time-travel to the 1920s, and later the 1950s, visiting the Jazz Age and post-war cool jazz period while experiencing culture clashes as they manoeuvre in the unfamiliar eras.

Critical response to the programme was generally favourable, with praise for its originality in addressing racism through the comedic insertion of modernity into a period setting. It is also known for satirizing historical dramas and their lack of diversity. There was critical praise for the writing, direction, chemistry of the main cast, and music. Taylor won the Breakthrough Award at the 2018 Royal Television Society Programme Awards, and the programme was nominated for Best Scripted Comedy at the 2018 British Academy Television Awards.

Cast 

Main cast (the jazz quartet):
Daniel Lawrence Taylor as Nick Wolton, trumpet and bandleader
Kadiff Kirwan as Jason, saxophone
Adelayo Adedayo as Lauren Wolton, drums
Samson Kayo as Horace Cunningham, trombone and vocals. Kayo also portrays Horace's grandfather Aston in the series 2 premiere.

Recurring:
John Stoate as Homeless Pete, operator of the time machine
Kevin 'KG' Garry as Curtis
Joseph Quinn as Ralph
Liz Kingsman as Victoria (series 1)
Anna Chancellor as Victoria (series 2)
Frankie Wilson as Terry, leader of a group of Teddy Boys
Kristy J Curtis as Rita, a Teddy Girl in Terry's group
Theo Barklem-Biggs as Len White, a club owner
Ellie White as Janice, a Russian spy
Oliver Wellington as JJ, Jason and Victoria's son
Clint Dyer as General Hands, a grifting jazz musician
Sam Douglas as Vadim, a Russian spy
Daniel Simonsen as Alexei, a Russian spy

Guests:
Kevin Eldon as Professor John Logie Baird
Nigel Havers as Dr Braithwaite, a eugenicist
Nigel Planer as Albert Langley, Victoria's butler
Sophie McShera as Rose Bickerton, Lauren's superfan
Amy Beth Hayes as Nicola, Nick's romantic interest
Danielle Vitalis as Myrtle, Horace's grandmother
Daniel Rigby as Martin, an alternate-reality version of Horace
Tom Bennett as Ronnie Scott, a jazz musician and club owner
Javone Prince as Pastor Gabriel
Patrick Baladi as Jonty Ripperton Clack, a conservative politician
Maple Briscoe as Time Travelling Girl

Episodes 

All episodes were directed by George Kane.  Episodes were written by Taylor and Barunka O'Shaughnessy, with episode 4 of series 2 co-written by Claire Downes, Ian Jarvis and Stuart Lane.

Series 1 (2017)

Series 2 (2019)

Development 

The programme was created by Taylor, who began working on it in 2015. He recalled that "I wanted to write a comedy for young black actors and I saw that shows such as The Inbetweeners, Drifters and Plebs were doing well."  Taylor was learning to play the trumpet and this interest led him to write about a black jazz band in the 1920s. While acting on post-apocalyptic romantic-comedy Cockroaches, Taylor decided to use a high concept and added time travel. He wrote a spec script with the working title Black to the Future, which was later changed to Blackwards and then Timewasters. Although racial themes run throughout the programme, Taylor has said that it is "first and foremost ... a comedy."

Timewasters is Taylor's first project writing for scripted television. He worked with an editor provided by Big Talk Productions, who were producing Cockroaches for ITV, and improved his script over a few drafts. According to Taylor, the programme came at a time when there were "discussion[s] about putting more black talent on screen". His spec script drew interest from ITV, which commissioned a rehearsal reading. Casting was made through auditions; though the main cast hadn't worked together before, they had a quick chemistry and studio executives thought they were longtime friends. Taylor then worked with Barunka O'Shaughnessy and through a series of drafts they improved the humour and pacing of his stories for the first series.

Production 

The programme was shot in Liverpool, taking advantage of the Georgian architecture in the city and period buildings including the Liverpool Athenaeum and Martins Bank Building. Series director George Kane used a cinematic look for the high-concept sitcom. Modern-day scenes used fixed-camera shots, hard surfaces, fluorescent lights and colour schemes that wouldn't appear in earlier periods. For the past, he used handheld cameras to give a sense of unpredictability. The 1920s scenes had a cohesive colour palette for props and wardrobe, while the 1950s scenes emulated the vivid Technicolor movies of that time.

Music 
The cast took lessons to act like they could play their instruments, but don't play any music in the series.

Nick Foster and Oli Julian composed the original music for the programme and arranged the jazzy covers of modern songs. Foster posted the Timewasters Season One Original Soundtrack on his SoundCloud account. Cover songs include "Hey Ya!", "Return of the Mack", and "Back to Black".

Songs in series 2 include "This Is How We Do It" (episode 1), "Flowers (In the Pouring Rain)" (episode 2), "Brown Sugar" and "My Angel Lover" (episode 3), "Do You Really Like It?" (episode 4), and "No Letting Go" (episode 5).

Themes 

Central themes in the series are race and injustices based on race, gender, and social status. Taylor stated in an interview that "Racism is ridiculous" and enjoyed mining it for humour. He set the first series in the 1920s to provide distance which made it less awkward to address racial issues.

Jimi Famuewa wrote for the Evening Standard that Timewasters challenged the way in which black characters are portrayed in period dramas.

Release 

The programme premiered on 9 October 2017 on ITV2. The second series was first broadcast 11 March to 8 April 2019 on ITV2.

The programme had its North American premiere streaming on CBC Gem in May 2020, with the second series available in September 2020. It premiered in the US on Amazon streaming service IMDb TV on 11 June 2021.

Reception

Ratings 

The first series was the most-viewed digital-channel comedy in 2017 for the 16–24 demographic in the UK.

Critical response 

Joel Keller of Decider recommended the programme, finding it to have unexpected humour in the way it treats racism "head on without taking itself ... seriously". Homa Khaleeli wrote for The Guardian that Timewasters challenges the archetypes and lack of diversity in period dramas. Cheryl Eddy of Gizmodo described the series as a sharply satirical comedy which expertly draws humour from racism. She praised the writing, the music, and the chemistry between the four lead actors. Melody McCune of Geek Girl Authority wrote that the series "deftly and brilliantly doles out social commentary" of systemic racism in life and in media. She praised the writing, the chemistry of the leads, and the music.

Angelica Guarino of Common Sense Media thoroughly enjoyed the programme, calling it "harmoniously ambitious, off-beat, and fast paced," with uniform story arcs. She particularly praised Taylor's performance, and encouraged parents to discuss with their children the racial issues raised and how it can be "empowering to make jokes about serious topics".

Noah Berlatsky of NBC News wrote that the "wonderful comedy ... subvert[s] heroic white narratives" of genre productions, using "hypervisible" outsider underdog characters who eschew expectations as their endeavours backfire, while broadly mocking the white characters who believe themselves special. Agathe Devionot of Just Focus felt that the series was a perfect fusion of comedy with the modernity of the main characters encountering cultural shock in the time-travel scenario. Devionot praised the "comic genius" of the main cast and the collaboration between writer and director.

The series was praised by members of the Royal Television Society (RTS):  Ed Gove noted the rarity of an all-black central cast on British TV, and summed up the programme's attitude toward race with a joke from the pilot: "People like us never get to time travel – it's what white people do, like skiing or brunch." Matthew Bell compared Timewasters to Derry Girls and Home, for finding humour in dark subject matter. Kate Holman wrote that the programme "challenges the traditional period drama" and expertly draws comedy from the juxtaposition of past and present prejudices.

On 3 April 2019, RTS London presented a livestreamed panel discussion, Timewasters: Production Focus, in which the programme was discussed by Adedayo, Kane, Kayo and Taylor. British Film Institute lead programmer and event chair Justin Johnson opened by stating that Timewasters "successfully combined a science fiction premise with a period setting [and] a full-on comedy."

Nominations and awards 

The programme was recognized at several national awards ceremonies. Taylor won the Breakthrough Award at the 2018 RTS Programme Awards. The series was nominated for Best Scripted Comedy at the 2018 British Academy Television Awards and Taylor and O'Shaughnessy were nominated for Best Comedy Writing on Television at the 2018 British Screenwriters' Awards.

Planned US remake 

In 2019, Taylor stated that he was in talks with LL Cool J as a potential producer for a US remake of the series for CBS.

In early 2021, it was announced that a US remake of Timewasters was in development at ABC, under showrunner Lauren Ashley Smith with Lawrence Taylor, Kenton Allen and Matthew Justice (Big Talk Productions) also executive producing. The remake would be set in New York City and explore the Harlem Renaissance while contrasting the black experience of 2021 with that of 1926.

See also
History of jazz

Footnotes

Notes

References

External links
 
Timewasters at Big Talk Productions website

 – panel discussion hosted by the Royal Television Society
Timewasters Season One Original Soundtrack at SoundCloud

2010s British sitcoms
2017 British television series debuts
2019 British television series endings
ITV sitcoms
English-language television shows
Television series by Big Talk Productions
Television series set in the 1920s
Television series set in 1958
British time travel television series
Racism in television